Hui Ka Lok (born 5 January 1994 in Hong Kong) is a former Hong Kong professional football player who currently plays for Hong Kong First Division club Sham Shui Po.

Club career
In 2014, Hui signed for Hong Kong Premier League club YFCMD.

In 2015, Hui signed for Hong Kong Premier League club Rangers.

On 25 October 2015, Hui scored his first goal in Hong Kong Premier League against Eastern, which wins the match 2:0.

On 3 July 2017, it was announced that Lee Man had signed Hui.

On 20 December 2018, Lee Man announced the loan of Hui to Hoi King for the second half of the 2018–19 season.

On 29 July 2019, it was announced that Hui had joined Tai Po.

On 2 November 2020, Hui signed for Hong Kong First Division club Sham Shui Po.

International career
On 14 November 2015, Hui scored his first goal for Hong Kong against Macau in Hong Kong–Macau Interport, helping the team to win the match for 2:0.

References

External links
 
 Hui Ka Lok at HKFA
 

1994 births
Living people
Hong Kong footballers
Hong Kong Premier League players
Hong Kong First Division League players
Eastern Sports Club footballers
Hong Kong Rangers FC players
Lee Man FC players
Hoi King SA players
Tai Po FC players
Association football forwards